Pingasa pallidata is a moth of the family Geometridae first described by Joseph de Joannis in 1913. It is found in Eritrea.

References

Moths described in 1913
Pseudoterpnini